Passiflora racemosa, the red passion flower, is a species of flowering plant in the family Passifloraceae, native to Brazil. They are followed by oblong green fruits.

The specific epithet racemosa indicates that the flowers are borne in racemes.

It has gained the Royal Horticultural Society's Award of Garden Merit.

References

External links

Flora of Brazil
Flora of South America
racemosa